The siege of Mukha was fought in 1423between the Ethiopian Empire and the Adal army. The Ethiopians were led by Yeshaq I, while the forces of Adal were led by Sultan Mansur ad-Din. The Adal army was victorious after a siege lasting two months.

Prelude

Early in his reign he launched an expedition against an Ethiopian Christian monarch, Emperor Dawit and drove him to Yedaya which was described as his royal seat, destroyed the Solomonic army , where according to Maqrizi, he was captured and killed.

His death however presumed to be an event of major importance, is not recorded by the Ethiopian Chronicles. The Ethiopian historian Taddesse Tamrat argues it's because the Ethiopian royal chronicles often deliberately attempted to suppress the violent deaths of the kings whose reigns they extol.

The siege

In 1423, Mansur resumed the war against the Ethiopian Empire, after defeating the imperial Ethiopian forces under Emperor Yeshaq I at Yedaya, the imperial seat of the region.

He then advanced to Mukha mountain (or Moha), where 30,000 imperial soldiers were besieged for two months before a truce was declared. The soldiers were given the choice of either embracing Islam or returning home, of which about 10,000 were said to have converted to Islam, while the remainder returned home.

References

Adal Sultanate 
Wars involving the states and peoples of Africa 
Military history of Africa